Photobacterium ganghwense is a gram-negative, oxidase and catalase positive, motile bacteria of the genus Photobacterium. Photobacterium ganghwense are found in marine environment. S.I. Paul et al. (2021) isolated, characterized and identified Photobacterium ganghwense from marine sponges of the Saint Martin's Island Area of the Bay of Bengal, Bangladesh.

Biochemical characteristics of Photobacterium ganghwense 
Colony, morphological, physiological, and biochemical characteristics of Photobacterium ganghwense are shown in the Table below.

Note: + = Positive; – =Negative; V =Variable (+/–)

References

Vibrionales
Bacteria described in 2006